Each year the Mississippi Mr. Basketball award is given to the best high school boys basketball player in the state of Mississippi by The Clarion-Ledger.

Award winners

Most winners by high school and college

See also
Mississippi Miss Basketball

References

Mr. and Miss Basketball awards
Basketball in Mississippi
Lists of people from Mississippi
Mississippi sports-related lists